VFF may refer to:
 Vancouver Asian Film Festival
 Vanuatu Football Federation
 Vendsyssel FF, a Danish football club
 Viborg FF, a Danish football club
 Vibram FiveFingers, a type of athletic shoe
 Vietnam Football Federation
 Vietnamese Fatherland Front, an umbrella group of pro-government "mass movements" in Vietnam
 Voices for Freedom, a New Zealand anti-vaccination advocacy group